Mid Galloway and Wigtown West (Ward 2) is one of the twelve wards used to elect members of the Dumfries and Galloway Council in Scotland. It elects four Councillors under the Single transferable vote system.

Councillors

Election results

2022 by-election 
Sandy Whitelaw resigned after a few months for personal reasons. Conservative candidate Richard Marsh was elected in the by-election held on 8 December 2022.

2022 election
2022 Dumfries and Galloway Council election

2017 election
2017 Dumfries and Galloway Council election

References

Wards of Dumfries and Galloway